Xenophrys ancrae is a species of frog in the family Megophryidae. Its type locality is Namdapha National Park and Tiger Reserve, Changlang District, Arunachal Pradesh, India.

References

ancrae
Amphibians of India
Endemic fauna of India
Fauna of Arunachal Pradesh
Amphibians described in 2013